The Canarsee (also Canarse and Canarsie) were a band of Munsee-speaking Lenape who inhabited the westernmost end of Long Island at the time the Dutch colonized New Amsterdam in the 1620s and 1630s.

They are credited with selling the island of Manhattan to the Dutch, even though they only occupied its lower reaches, with the balance the seasonal hunting grounds of the Wecquaesgeek of the Wappinger people to the north.

The Canarsee were among the peoples who were conflated with other Long Island bands into a group called the Metoac, an aggregation which failed to recognize their linguistic differences and varying tribal affinities.

Name
As was common practice early in the days of white European colonisation of North America, a people came to be associated with a place, with its name displacing theirs among the colonies and those associated with them, such as explorers, mapmakers, trading company superiors who sponsored many of the early settlements, and officials in the colonizers' mother country in Europe.  This was the case of the "Canarsee" people, whose name, to the extent they identified with one, is lost in history.

Sale of Manhattan
It is the "Canarse" [sic], who only utilized the very southern end of Manhattan island, the Manhattoes, as a hunting ground, who are credited with selling Peter Minuit the entirety of the island for $24 in 1639. A confusion of possession on the part of the Canarsees who failed to tell the Dutch that the balance of island was the hunting ground of the Wecquaesgeek, a Wappinger band of southwest Westchester County.

Red Hook Lane Heritage Trail
Red Hook Lane, a Carnesee path thru the marshland was in colonial times the main trail from Brooklyn Heights  to Red Hook. The Red Hook Lane Heritage Trail in Red Hook marks in a zig-zag fashion where the old indian trail was to Cypress Tree Island. It begins at the Red Hook Lane Arresick.

Notes

References

Native American tribes in New York (state)
Eastern Algonquian peoples
Extinct Native American tribes
Algonquian ethnonyms
People of New Netherland
Nassau County, New York